Kumar (Sanskrit: कुमार kumārá) is a title, given name, middle name, or a family name found in the Indian subcontinent, mainly in India, Bangladesh, Sri Lanka, and Nepal, though not specific to any religion, ethnicity, or caste. It is a generic title which variously means prince, son, boy, or chaste. It is the 11th most common family name in the world as of August 2019.

History
The origin of kumar can be traced back to the early development of Hinduism and its origin in ancient India. The first usage of Kumar was for the Four Kumāras, the four sons of Brahma from the Puranic texts of Hinduism named Sanaka, Sanatana, Sanandana, and Sanat.

In Skanda Purana, the largest Mahapurana, a genre of eighteen Hindu religious texts, the text is devoted mainly to the leelas of Kartikeya, son of Shiva and Parvati. "Kumar" is used to refer Kartikeya.

Geographical distribution
As of 2014, 97.3% of all known bearers of the surname Kumar were residents of India. The frequency of the surname was higher than national average in the following states and union territories:

 1. Himachal Pradesh (1: 9)
 2. Chandigarh (1: 10)
 3. Delhi (1: 11)
 3. Haryana (1: 11)
 4. Bihar (1: 15)
 5. Jammu and Kashmir (1: 16)
 5. Uttar Pradesh (1: 16)
 6. Uttarakhand (1: 28)
 7. Rajasthan (1: 30)
 8. Punjab (1: 39)

Notable people

First name
Kumar Basnet, (born 1943) Nepalese folk singer
 Kumar Dharmasena, Sri Lankan cricketer and International cricket umpire
 Kumar Gandharva (1924–1992), Indian singer
 Kumar Gaurav, Indian film actor
Kumar Kashyap Mahasthavir, Nepalese Buddhist monk
 Kumar Malavalli, Indian businessman
 Kumar Mangalam Birla, Indian industrialist
 Kumar Pallana, Indian film actor
 Kumar Pradhan, Nepalese scholar
 Kumar Ram Narain Karthikeyan, Indian race car driver
 Kumar Rocker, American baseball pitcher
 Kumar Sangakkara, Sri Lankan cricketer and a former captain of the Sri Lanka national cricket team
Kumar Sanu, Indian playback singer
 Kumar Shri Duleepsinhji, cricketer who played for England
 Kumar Shri Ranjitsinhji, AKA K. S. Ranjitsinhji, Indian prince, maharaja and Test cricketer
 Kumar Vishwas, Hindi-language performance poet

Middle name
 Abhas Kumar Ganguly, birth name of Kishore Kumar
 Ajith Kumar Siriwardena, Sri Lankan Briton professor of hepato-pancreatico-biliary surgery 
 Akshay Kumar Datta, Bengali writer
 Amal Kumar Raychaudhuri, a leading physicist
 Amrit Kumar Bohara, Nepalese politician
 Anil Kumar Jha, (born 1969) Nepalese politician 
 Anjani Kumar Sharma, Nepalese surgeon
 Arjun Kumar Basnet, (born 1975) Nepalese marathon runner
 General Arunkumar Vaidya, the former Chief of Indian Army
 Bijay Kumar Gachchhadar, Nepalese politician 
 Devendra Kumar Joshi, the Indian Chief of Naval Staff
 Hemanta Kumar Mukhopadhyay, a Bengali singer, composer and producer
 Inder Kumar Gujral, an Indian politician who served as the 12th Prime Minister of India
 Keshav Kumar Budhathoki, Nepali politician
 Madhav Kumar Nepal, Former Prime Minister of Nepal
 Manoj Kumar Pandey, Indian Army officer, recipient of the Param Vir Chakra
 Pawan Kumar Chamling, an Sikkimese politician who served as the 5th Chief Minister of Sikkim
 Pradip Kumar Rai known as Byakul Maila, Nepalese poet
 Prafulla Kumar Mahanta, Indian politician who was the leader of the Assam Movement, a former Chief Minister of Assam.
 Prem Kumar Dhumal, chief minister of Indian state  
Raj Kumar Saini, Indian politician
Raj Kumar Rao, Indian actor
Raj Kumar Kapoor, Indian actor, director
 Rakesh Kumar Singh Bhadauria, retired Indian Air Force officer, who served as the Chief of the Air Staff of the Indian Air Force
 Roop Kumar Rathod, an Indian playback singer and music director
 Sanjeev Kumar Yadav, DANIPS officer. He currently serves as Deputy Commissioner of Police(DCP), Special Cell, in Delhi Police.
 Santosh Kumar Ghosh, Bengali writer and journalist
 Santosh Kumar Gupta, former Indian Navy admiral, recipient of Maha Vir Chakra
Satinder Kumar Saini, vice chief of the Indian army
 Selvar Kumar Silvaras (c. 1971–1998), Singaporean convicted murderer
 Shailendra Kumar Upadhyaya, Nepalese diplomat
 Shiv Kumar Batalvi, a Punjabi language poet
 Siddharth Kumar Tewary, Indian television producer and director
 Srinivas Kumar Sinha, Indian military officer
 Sunil Kumar Yadav, Nepalese politician
 Suniti Kumar Chatterji, an Indian linguist, educationist and litterateur
 Tapan Kumar Pradhan, Indian bank, activist and poet
 Tej Kumar Shrestha, Nepalese zoologist
 Vijay Kumar Malhotra, Indian politician
 Vijay Kumar Pandey, Nepalese journalist
 Vijay Kumar Singh, Indian politician and a retired four star general in the Indian Army
 Vineet Kumar Singh, Indian film actor
 Vinod Kumar Shukla, modern Hindi writer
 Yogesh Kumar Joshi, 17th and the current Commander, XIV Corps of the Indian Army
 Yogesh Kumar Sabharwal, the 36th Chief Justice of India

Last name
 Ajith Kumar, an Indian actor who works mainly in Tamil cinema
 Akhil Kumar, an Indian boxer who has won several international and national boxing awards
 Akshay Kumar, stage name of Indian-Canadian film actor, producer and martial artist, Rajiv Bhatia
 Amit Kumar, Indian film playback singer, actor, and director
 Amitava Kumar, Indian writer, journalist, professor
 Anand Kumar, Indian mathematician
 Anil Kumar, Indian businessman, consultant
 Ashok Kumar, AKA Dadamoni in Bengali, Indian film actor
 Arun Kumar, Indian politician
 Bhuvneshwar Kumar, Indian pace bowler
 Bandi Sanjay Kumar, Indian politician
 Chetan Kumar, Indian actor
 Darshan Kumar, Indian actor
 Dev Kumar, Indian actor
 Digendra Kumar, Indian military officer
 Dilip Kumar, Indian film actor known as the 'Tragedy King' and a former Member of Parliament
 Divya Khosla Kumar, Indian film actress, producer and director
 E. Santhosh Kumar, Indian writer
 Girish Kumar, Indian film actor
 G. V. Prakash Kumar, Indian film score and soundtrack composer and singer
 Gulshan Kumar, T-Series music label owner
 Guru Rudra Kumar
 Hiten Kumar, Gujrati film actor
 Inder Kumar, Indian actor
 Indra Kumar, an Indian film director and producer
 Jeeva Kumar, Indian kabbadi player
 Jitender Kumar (flyweight boxer), an Indian flyweight boxer
 Kanhaiya Kumar, Indian politician
 Kishore Kumar, Indian film playback singer, actor, lyricist, composer, producer, director, screenwriter and scriptwriter
 Manoj Kumar (boxer), Indian boxer who won a gold medal in the light welterweight division at the 2010 Commonwealth Games
 Manoj Kumar, an award-winning Indian actor and director in the Bollywood
 María Teresa Kumar, a political organizer and voting rights activist for Latinos in the United States
 Meira Kumar, an Indian politician and a five time Member of Parliament
 Mukesh Kumar, Indian cricketer
 Navin Kumar
 Nirmalya Kumar, professor and businessman
 Nish Kumar, British comedian
 Nitish Kumar, Indian politician who served as the 22nd Chief Minister of Bihar
 Oil Kumar, aa Indian ganglord and organized crime boss
 Pawan Kumar, several people, including:
 Pawan Kumar (director), Indian film director, actor, producer, and screenwriter
 Pawan Kumar (wrestler), Indian wrestler
 Pradeep Kumar, Indian actor in Hindi, Bengali and English-language films
 Praveen Kumar, Indian medium-pace swing bowler
 Prem Kumar, several people, including:
 Prem Kumar (Malayalam actor), Indian film actor in Malayalam films
 Prem Kumar (Kannada actor), Indian film actor in Kannada films
 Raaj Kumar, Indian film actor
 Rajendra Kumar, Indian film actor
 Ravi Kumar (Indian footballer)
 Ravish Kumar, Indian Journalist at NDTV India
 Ritu Kumar, Indian fashion designer
 Sanjay Kumar, several people, including:
 Sanjay Kumar (business executive), former CEO of Computer Associates
 Sanjay Kumar (soldier), Indian Army soldier who received the Param Vir Chakra
 Sanjeev Kumar, Indian film actor
 Shashi Kumar, or Shashikumar, Indian actor and politician
 Sushil Kumar, several people, including:
 Sushil Kumar (wrestler), Indian World Champion wrestler
 Tulsi Kumar, an Indian playback singer for Bollywood films
 Uttam Kumar, Indian (Bengali) cinema actor and contemporary of Dilip Kumar
 Uttar Kumar, famous actor in north India
 Venkatesh Kumar, Hindustani vocalist.
 Vikram Kumar, madman and sad Spurs fan
 Vijay Kumar (sport shooter), Indian champion shooter, Olympic 2012 silver medalist
 Vimal Kumar, Indian badminton player
 Vinay Kumar, Indian cricket player
 Vinay Kumar (pathologist), the Alice Hogge & Arthur Baer Professor of Pathology at the University of Chicago
 Vinoth Kumar, Indian football player

See also
 Kumarbi
 Keyumars
 Yuvraj
 Arunkumar

Notes

Indian surnames
Surnames
Gujarati-language surnames